The 2017 Kansas Jayhawks football team represented the University of Kansas in the 2017 NCAA Division I FBS football season. It was the Jayhawks 128th season. The Jayhawks were led by third-year head coach David Beaty. They played their home games at Memorial Stadium and were members of the Big 12 Conference.

Head coach David Beaty received a contract extension following the Jayhawks' 2016 season keeping him under contract until the conclusion of the 2021 season.

The Jayhawks entered the season with a 41-game road losing streak that dates back to the 2009 season when Kansas defeated UTEP 34–7, which was extended to 46 during the season. The Jayhawks have also lost 39 of their last 41 games against FBS opponents, including 12 straight. The Jayhawks also finished the season with an 11 game losing streak, losing every game after they defeated Southeast Missouri State in their season opener. Since the conclusion of the 2015 season, the team has gone 3–33.

The Jayhawks returned 2nd team All-Big 12 junior defensive end, Dorance Armstrong, who was also named Pre-season Big 12 Defensive Player of the year for the 2017 season.

All-conference players lost

Returning all-conference players

Schedule

Schedule Source:

Game summaries

Southeast Missouri State

Central Michigan

at Ohio

West Virginia

Texas Tech

at Iowa State

at TCU

Kansas State

Baylor

at Texas

Oklahoma

at Oklahoma State

Roster
This is a preliminary roster based on the 2016 roster with seniors removed. The roster will become official during spring practice for outgoing transfers and again when training camp starts for incoming freshmen, walk-ons, and transfers.

References

Kansas
Kansas Jayhawks football seasons
Kansas Jayhawks football